Brickellia simplex, the Sonoran brickellbush, is a North American species of flowering plants in the family Asteraceae. It is native to northern Mexico (Chihuahua, Sonora, Coahuila) and the southwestern United States (New Mexico, Arizona).

Brickellia simplex is a branching shrub up to 60 cm (24 inches) tall, growing from a woody caudex. It produces many small flower heads with yellow disc florets but no ray florets.

References

simplex
Flora of the Southwestern United States
Flora of Mexico
Plants described in 1853